Gambling in Russia is legal in four regional subject areas, and in 2009 was made illegal in all other areas of Russia.

In 2009, gambling was banned almost everywhere in Russia. The only exceptions are four specially arranged zones in the Altai, Krasnodar, Kaliningrad, and Primorsky regions.

History

At the end of 1927, the People’s Commissar of the Interior presented a report devoted to gambling and the gaming business existing at that time to the RSFSR SPC. The main idea voiced through the report was that its incompatibility of an idle, bourgeois pastime with
the true spirit of the working proletariat. And, regardless of the rather modest figures in the gaming sector (for example, only 4 small gaming houses operated in Leningrad at that time), the key prohibitive provisions in the report were approved.

All this led to a ban on the opening of gambling houses in worker districts, it was followed by a ban on gambling  in the entire districts, and later, on May 8, 1928, by the resolution of the USSR SPC, all Soviet Republics were instructed, the reasons not being explained, "to take measures on the immediate closure of any facilities for card games, roulette, lotto and other kinds of gambling". The closure of gaming houses and the gambling ban were pushed by the penal policy course shaped by the Soviet state, providing for overall reinforcement of criminal sanctions in the country and the modification of the state's penitentiary policy upon the whole. Later, lotteries were also restricted. On June 6, 1928, the Workers-Peasants’ Government of the RSFSR issues the resolution, "On Banning the Draw of Liquors in Lotteries". First, on January 1, 1930, the USSR SPC issues the resolution "On the Procedure of Issuing Permits for Lottery Arrangement", and then, on August 31, 1932, another USSR SPC Resolution #1336 was announced, "On the Regulation of the Lottery Business".

The first slot machines which appeared in the country quite lawfully, were installed only in 1988  in hotels which were part of the USSR State Committee of Foreign Tourism (Goscomintourist). Within the system, the All-Russian Business External Trade Union (VHVO) "Intourservice" is set up, developing new kinds of additional services for foreign tourists, payable in free convertible currency. And private businesses have no access to gambling operations. Despite an eagerness to deal with slot machine installation and operation, the Soviete authorities allowed it only within its state structures, only as an experiment. To be on the safe side, there was a legal reminder that the business still cannot be entered. On December 29, 1988, the Council of Ministers of the USSR issued another resolution, this time "On the Regulation of Certain Activities of Cooperatives According to the Law on Cooperation in the USSR", which, in particular, stressed that cooperatives are not entitled to perform gambling operations.

On August 23, 1989, the Soviet government lifted its ban on gambling and opened the first gambling house in Moscow. The first slot machines began to be installed in 1988 in the hotels of the USSR State Committee for Tourism. In the first year, 226 slot machines with cash prizes were installed in Intourist hotels in Moscow, Leningrad, Sochi, Yalta, Minsk, Tallinn, Vyborg and Pyatigorsk. The first casino in the USSR, Astoria Palace, opened in the Estonian SSR in the spring of 1989 at the Palace Hotel in Tallinn. The second casino was opened in Moscow on August 23, 1989 at the Savoy Hotel.

Poker in Russia was very popular during the collapse of the USSR, when people started being interested in Western culture and values.

In the Soviet Union it was possible to play poker only in cellar clubs or the casino. In addition, players often gathered in private flats. By the end of the 90s it was the first attempt to hold poker tournaments, but it did not get the widespread popularity at the time.

According to the Casinos Analyze, an online platform for gamblers used in CIS region, there were more than 100 active online casinos in Russia as for 2021.

In 2010, the Russian Masters Poker Cup was held in one of the legal poker zones, Azov City. This event did not cause much popularity, since the location of the gambling zone was unsuccessful, two casinos were in an empty field. The hotel in the casino had only 14 rooms. The zone became popular with players from Rostov-on-Don, while the rest preferred to play via the Internet, or traveled to the CIS countries, where live poker was not prohibited.

Taxation
In 2004, the Law #142-FZ “On Gambling Tax” being in effect for a sixth year, Chapter 29 “Gambling Tax” of the Russian Federation's Tax Code came into effect. A new and the most complicated stage in the area of gambling taxation began. As of January 1, 2004, gambling tax became regional and its receipts are transferred to the budgets of the Federation's constituent entities. As of 2004, each region was entitled to independently determine the gambling tax rate within the limits provided for by the Law #142-FZ “On Gambling Tax”. The taxation rate for slot machines with cash winnings was 1,500 to 7,500 roubles and for gaming tables, totalisator cash desks and bookmaker cash desks – 25,000 to 125,000 roubles. Any previous privileges with regard to the gambling tax were cancelled.

Online casino tax rate: fixed amount, monthly 2,500,000 – 3,000,000 RUB (payable by online  sports betting licence holders, the only kind of online gambling licence available in Russia).

Legality

The state regulation of activities involved in gambling organisation and arrangement was performed by the government, by the federal executive agency authorised by the government to perform functions on standard and legal regulation in the area of
gambling organisation, by other federal executive authorities within their competence and by the governmental bodies of the Russian Federation's constituent entities, authorised to perform the functions of gaming zone management.

Gambling may be arranged solely by legal entities registered according to the set procedure within the Russian Federation. Gambling cannot be arranged by legal entities, the founders (participants) of which include the Russian Federation, the Russian Federation's constituent entities or local government authorities.

The law contemplates that four gaming zones will be created within the Russian Federation; meanwhile no more than one gaming zone may be created within one and the same constituent entity. If Legal Requlation of Gambling in Former USSR Countries and Foreign States the created gaming zone belongs to several regions, no other gaming zones may be created within their territories. Gaming zones are to be set up within the Altay, Primorie and Kaliningrad regions and on the border between the Krasnodar region and Rostov region. The procedure of gaming zone creation and liquidation, their names, borders and other characteristics, will be determined by the government upon an agreement with the government bodies in constituent entities. The existence of gaming zones has no time limits. A decision on the liquidation of a gaming zone by the government may not be made until ten years after it was created. A ruling on the creation of a gaming zone may set requirements for certain types of gambling facilities, as well as other restrictions. Gambling facilities, except bookmakers’ offices and totalisators, may be opened only within the gaming zones according to the procedure set out by the law. Furthermore, the boundaries of the gaming zones should have been outlined by July 1, 2007, whereas they cannot be created on land in populated localities.

The names of the territories are "Siberian Coin" (Altay), "Yantarnaya" (Kaliningrad region), "Azov-city" (Rostov region) and "Primorie" (Primorie region).

The gambling operator should submit the data needed for exercising control of compliance with the legislative requirements. The net assets of the gambling operator, throughout the entire period of their activities, cannot be less than: 600,000,000 roubles (for operators of casinos and slot halls) and 100,000,000 roubles (for operators of bookmakers’ offices and totalisators). The procedure for the calculation of the value of the gambling operator's net assets will be set by the Ministry of Finance, while the Government may establish additional requirements for gambling operators.

The gambling operator shall secure the personal safety of gamblers, other visitors to gambling facilities and their employees during their stay in the gambling facility. People under 18 cannot be the gambling operator's employees or visit a gambling facility. Gambling facilities may be located only in buildings which are capital construction projects. Gambling facilities cannot be located in residential fund properties, uncompleted constructions, temporary structures, kiosks, open shelters and other similar premises; in buildings and constructions where children's, educational, healthcare and sanatorium institutions are located; in buildings and constructions including bus stations, railway stations, river stations, river ports, airports, at stations and stops for any public transport(common carriers) for urban and suburban services, etc., as well as on plots of land where the above-mentioned facilities are situated.

Bookmakers’ offices and totalisators, apart from those opened within gaming zones, may be opened solely based on licences, the
procedure of issuing which will be determined by the government The customer service area for gamblers in casinos cannot be less
than 800 square metres. The customer service area in a casino shall feature at least ten gaming tables. Should slot machines be installed in the casino customer service area, the area of the slot machine zone cannot be less than 100 square metres and the zone shall feature at least 50 slot machines. The technically implied average winnings (payback) from a slot machine cannot be less than 90 percent

The law came into effect as of January 1, 2007. The gambling facilities which comply with the above-mentioned requirements may continue their operations till June 30, 2009, without obtaining permits for activities on gambling organisation and arrangement in gaming zones. Any gambling facilities that fail to comply with the requirements set out by the law shall be closed by July 1, 2007. Gambling operations using information and telecommunication networks, including the Internet, and communication means, including mobile communications, are prohibited. Gaming business licensing was also changed. In fact, there remained only one activity to be licensed – the organisation and arrangement of gambling in bookmakers’ offices and totalisators. In legal terms, gambling operations in casinos and slot halls will exist only on a pro forma basis as of July 1, 2007 and as of July 1, 2009, licensing will be completely substituted with a system of permits and shift to a regional level from a federal one.
The latest edition of the law on gambling business falls on March 28, 2017. This Act regulates the legal framework of state control over the activities of institutions that organize gambling. The Act introduces restrictions on the exercise of this activity in order to protect citizens' morals and the legitimate interests of the population.

The legal gambling age in Russia is 18.

See also

Russian roulette, often attributed to having started in Russia
Problem gambling
Fyodor Dostoyevsky, a Russian who is considered to be one of Europe's major novelists, became addicted to gambling.

Notes

References
Los Angeles Times: Irked gamblers cash in their chips as Russia follows through on casino ban
Washington Post: Gambling Industry Explodes In Russia
Legal regulation of gambling in former USSR countries, Evgeny Kovtun. 
Stake Casino - Crypto Gambling Site Nr. 1 Worldwide

 
Society of Russia
Economy of Russia